Seckel is a surname. Notable people with the surname include:

 Al Seckel (1958–2015), American writer and skeptic
 Emil Seckel (1864–1924), German jurist and law historian
 Jos Seckel (1881–1945), Dutch painter

See also
 Seckel Isaac Fränkel (1765–1835), German rabbi
 Seckel syndrome
 Hardick & Seckel Factory

German-language surnames
Jewish surnames